Tooele Technical College is a public technical school in Tooele, Utah. It is part of the Utah System of Technical Colleges. Tooele Technical College offers high school students and adults living in Tooele County programs in Business, Health Care, Information, Manufacturing, Transportation, and Service Industry Technologies.

External links
 Official website

Buildings and structures in Tooele County, Utah
Education in Tooele County, Utah
Educational institutions accredited by the Council on Occupational Education
Utah College of Applied Technology Colleges